This article lists the various snakes of Australia which live in a wide variety of habitats around the country. The amethystine python or scrub python is considered Australia's largest native snake.

Victoria

North West 

 Common copperhead, Austrelaps
 Demansia psammophis
 Masters' snake, Drysdalia mastersii
 Echiopsis curta
 Tiger snake, Notechis scutatus
 Western brown snake, Pseudonaja nuchalis
 Eastern brown snake, Pseudonaja textilis
 Simoselaps australis
 Suta nigriceps
 Suta spectabilis
 Suta suta
 Bandy-bandy, Vermicella annulata

South west

 Lowland copperhead, Austrelaps superbus
 White-lipped snake, Drysdalia coronoides
 Morelia spilota variegata
 Tiger snake, Notechis scutatus
 Red bellied black snake, Pseudechis porphyriacus
 Eastern brown snake, Pseudonaja textilis
 Suta flagellum

Central 

 Lowland copperhead, Austrelaps superbus
 Morelia spilota variegata
 Tiger snake, Notechis scutatus
 Red bellied black snake, Pseudechis porphyriacus
 Eastern brown snake, Pseudonaja textilis
 Cryptophis nigrescens
 Suta flagellum
 Suta nigriceps
 Suta spectabilis
 Suta suta
 Bandy-bandy, Vermicella annulata

Melbourne 

 Lowland copperhead, Austrelaps superbus
 White-lipped snake, Drysdalia coronoides
 Tiger snake, Notechis scutatus
 Red bellied black snake, Pseudechis porphyriacus
 Eastern brown snake, Pseudonaja textilis
 Cryptophis nigrescens
 Suta flagellum
 Suta spectabilis
 Bandy-bandy, Vermicella annulata

Gippsland 

 Lowland copperhead, Austrelaps superbus
 White-lipped snake, Drysdalia coronoides
 Tiger snake, Notechis scutatus
 Red bellied black snake, Pseudechis porphyriacus
 Eastern brown snake, Pseudonaja textilis
 Cryptophis nigrescens
 Bandy-bandy, Vermicella annulata

Tasmania 
 Lowland copperhead, Austrelaps superbus
 White-lipped snake, Drysdalia coronoides
 Tiger snake, Notechis scutatus

Northern Territory

North 
 Black-headed python, Aspidites melanocephalus
 Liasis childreni
 Liasis fuscus
 Olive python, Liasis olivaceus
 Oenpelli python, Morelia oenpelliensis
 Morelia spilota variegata
 Boiga irregularis
 Cerberus rynchops
 Dendrelaphis punctulata
 Pseudoferania polylepis
 Fordonia leucobalia
 Myron richardsonii
 Stegonotus cucullatus
 Keelback, Tropidonophis mairii
 Common death adder, Acanthophis antarcticus
 Acanthophis praelongus
 Desert death adder, Acanthophis pyrrhus
 Demansia vestigiata
 Demansia olivacea
 Demansia papuensis
 Demansia torquata
 Orange-naped snake, Furina ornata
 Oxyuranus scutellatus
 King brown snake, Pseudechis australis
 Spotted brown snake, Pseudonaja guttata
 Ringed brown snake, Pseudonaja modesta
 Western brown snake, Pseudonaja nuchalis
 Eastern brown snake, Pseudonaja textilis
 Cryptophis pallidiceps
 Simoselaps fasciolatus
 Suta suta
 Vermicella multifasciata
 Bandy-bandy, Vermicella annulata

South 
 Bandy-bandy, Vermicella annulata
 Suta suta
 Suta punctata
 Suta monachus
 Simoselaps semifasciatus
 Simoselaps fasciolatus
 Simoselaps incinctus
 Simoselaps bertholdi
 Simoselaps anomalus
 Eastern brown snake, Pseudonaja textilis
 Western brown snake, Pseudonaja nuchalis
 Ingram's brown snake, Pseudonaja ingrami
 Ringed brown snake, Pseudonaja modesta
 Spotted brown snake, Pseudonaja guttata
 Inland taipan, Oxyuranus microlepidotus
 Orange-naped snake, Furina ornata
 Demansia psammophis
 Demansia olivacea
 Desert death adder, Acanthophis pyrrhus
 Common death adder, Acanthophis antarcticus
 Morelia spilota variegata
 Morelia bredli
 Liasis stimsoni
 Olive python, Liasis olivaceus
 Liasis childreni
 Woma Python, Aspidites ramsayi
 Black-headed python, Aspidites melanocephalus

Western Australia

Gascoyne 
 Desert death adder, Acanthophis pyrrhus
 Demansia olivacea
 Demansia psammophis
 Orange-naped snake, Furina ornata
 Liasis perthensis
 Morelia spilota variegata
 Pseudechis australis
 Ringed brown snake, Pseudonaja modesta
 Western brown snake, Pseudonaja nuchalis
 Simoselaps anomalus
 Simoselaps approximans
 Simoselaps bertholdi
 Simoselaps fasciolatus
 Simoselaps littoralis
 Simoselaps semifasciatus
 Suta fasciata
 Suta punctata

Goldfields-Esperance 
 Common death adder, Acanthophis antarcticus
 Desert death adder, Acanthophis pyrrhus
 Woma Python, Aspidites ramsayi
 Demansia psammophis
 Drysdalia coronata
 Drysdalia mastersii
 Echiopsis atriceps
 Echiopsis curta
 Orange-naped snake, Furina ornata
 Liasis stimsoni
 Morelia spilota variegata
 Notechis ater
 King brown snake, Pseudechis australis
 Spotted mulga snake, Pseudechis butleri
 Dugite, Pseudonaja affinis
 Ringed brown snake, Pseudonaja modesta
 Western brown snake, Pseudonaja nuchalis
 Cryptophis bicolor
 Simoselaps bertholdi
 Simoselaps bimaculatus
 Simoselaps fasciolatus
 Simoselaps semifasciatus
 Suta fasciata
 Suta gouldii
 Suta monachus
 Suta nigriceps
 Suta spectabilis
 Suta suta

Great Southern 
 Common death adder, Acanthophis antarcticus
 Drysdalia coronata
 Echiopsis curta
 Short-nosed snake, Elapognathus minor
 Morelia spilota variegata
 Notechis ater
 Dugite, Pseudonaja affinis
 Cryptophis bicolor
 Simoselaps bertholdi
 Simoselaps bimaculatus
 Suta gouldii
 Suta nigriceps

Kimberley 
 Northern death adder, Acanthophis praelongus
 Desert death adder, Acanthophis pyrrhus
 Woma Python, Aspidites ramsayi
 Boiga irregularis
 Cerberus rynchops
 Demansia olivacea
 Demansia papuensis
 Demansia psammophis
 Demansia atra
 Common tree snake, Dendrelaphis punctulata
 Fordonia leucobalia
 Orange-naped snake, Furina ornata
 Liasis childreni
 Brown water python, Liasis fuscus
 Olive python, Liasis olivaceus
 Liasis stimsoni
 Rough-scaled python, Morelia carinata
 Morelia spilota variegata
 Myron richardsonii
 Oxyuranus scutellatus
 King brown snake, Pseudechis australis
 Ringed brown snake, Pseudonaja modesta
 Western brown snake, Pseudonaja nuchalis
 Cryptophis pallidiceps
 Simoselaps anomalus
 Simoselaps minimus
 Simoselaps semifasciatus
 Suta ordensis
 Suta punctata
 Suta suta
 Keelback, Tropidonophis mairii
 Vermicella multifasciata

Mid West 
 Desert death adder, Acanthophis pyrrhus
 Woma Python, Aspidites ramsayi
 Demansia psammophis
 Drysdalia coronata
 Echiopsis curta
 Orange-naped snake, Furina ornata
 Liasis stimsoni
 King brown snake, Pseudechis australis
 Spotted mulga snake, Pseudechis butleri
 Ringed brown snake, Pseudonaja modesta
 Western brown snake, Pseudonaja nuchalis
 Simoselaps bertholdi
 Simoselaps bimaculatus
 Simoselaps fasciolatus
 Simoselaps littoralis
 Simoselaps semifasciatus
 Suta fasciata
 Suta gouldii
 Suta monachus
 Bandy-bandy, Vermicella annulata

Peel 
 Common death adder, Acanthophis antarcticus
 Demansia psammophis
 Drysdalia coronata
 Short-nosed snake, Elapognathus minor
 Morelia spilota variegata
 Notechis ater
 King brown snake, Pseudechis australis
 Dugite, Pseudonaja affinis
 Pseudonaja modesta
 Pseudonaja nuchalis
 Simoselaps bertholdi
 Simoselaps bimaculatus
 Simoselaps calonotus
 Simoselaps littoralis
 Simoselaps semifasciatus
 Suta gouldii

Perth 
 Acanthophis antarcticus
 Demansia psammophis
 Drysdalia coronata
 Elapognathus minor
 Morelia spilota variegata
 Notechis ater
 Pseudechis australis
 Pseudonaja affinis
 Pseudonaja modesta
 Pseudonaja nuchalis
 Simoselaps bertholdi
 Simoselaps bimaculatus
 Simoselaps calonotus
 Simoselaps littoralis
 Simoselaps semifasciatus
 Suta gouldii

Pilbara 
 Acanthophis pyrrhus
 Woma Python, Aspidites ramsayi
 Demansia olivacea
 Demansia psammophis
 Fordonia leucobalia
 Furina ornata
 Liasis olivaceus
 Liasis perthensis
 Liasis stimsoni
 Morelia spilota variegata
 Pseudonaja modesta
 Pseudonaja nuchalis
 Simoselaps anomalus
 Simoselaps approximans
 Simoselaps semifasciatus
 Suta fasciata
 Suta punctata
 Suta suta
 Bandy-bandy, Vermicella annulata

South West 
 Drysdalia coronata
 Echiopsis curta
 Elapognathus minor
 Morelia spilota variegata
 Notechis ater
 Pseudonaja affinis
 Cryptophis bicolor
 Suta gouldii
 Suta nigriceps

Wheatbelt 
 Acanthophis antarcticus
 Aspidites ramsayi
 Demansia psammophis
 Elapognathus minor
 Furina ornata
 Liasis stimsoni
 Morelia spilota variegata
 Notechis ater
 Pseudechis australis
 Pseudonaja affinis
 Pseudonaja modesta
 Pseudonaja nuchalis
 Cryptophis bicolor
 Simoselaps bertholdi
 Simoselaps calonotus
 Simoselaps fasciolatus
 Simoselaps semifasciatus
 Suta gouldii
 Suta monachus
 Suta nigriceps

South Australia

Adelaide 
 Acanthophis antarcticus
 Austrelaps superbus
 Demansia psammophis
 Notechis ater
 Notechis scutatus
 Pseudechis porphyriacus
 Pseudonaja nuchalis
 Pseudonaja textilis
 Simoselaps bertholdi
 Suta flagellum
 Suta spectabilis
 Suta suta

Central 
 Acanthophis antarcticus
 Demansia psammophis
 Drysdalia mastersii
 Furina diadema
 Morelia spilota variegata
 Notechis ater
 Notechis scutatus
 Pseudechis australis
 Pseudonaja nuchalis
 Pseudonaja textilis
 Simoselaps australis
 Simoselaps bertholdi
 Suta nigriceps
 Suta spectabilis
 Suta suta
 Bandy-bandy, Vermicella annulata

Eyre Peninsula 
 Acanthophis antarcticus
 Demansia psammophis
 Drysdalia mastersii
 Echiopsis curta
 Morelia spilota variegata
 Notechis ater
 Notechis scutatus
 Pseudechis australis
 Pseudonaja affinis
 Pseudonaja nuchalis
 Pseudonaja textilis
 Simoselaps bertholdi
 Simoselaps bimaculatus
 Simoselaps fasciolatus
 Suta nigriceps
 Suta spectabilis
 Suta suta
 Bandy-bandy, Vermicella annulata

Murray & Mallee 
 Demansia psammophis
 Drysdalia mastersii
 Echiopsis curta
 Morelia spilota variegata
 Notechis ater
 Notechis scutatus
 Pseudechis porphyriacus
 Pseudonaja nuchalis
 Pseudonaja textilis
 Simoselaps australis
 Suta flagellum
 Suta nigriceps
 Suta spectabilis
 Suta suta
 Bandy-bandy, Vermicella annulata

Outback 
 Acanthophis antarcticus
 Acanthophis pyrrhus
 Aspidites ramsayi
 Demansia psammophis
 Drysdalia mastersii
 Echiopsis curta
 Furina diadema
 Furina ornata
 Liasis stimsoni
 Morelia spilota variegata
 Oxyuranus microlepidotus
 Pseudechis australis
 Pseudonaja affinis
 Pseudonaja guttata
 Pseudonaja modesta
 Pseudonaja nuchalis
 Pseudonaja textilis
 Simoselaps anomalus
 Simoselaps australis
 Simoselaps bertholdi
 Simoselaps bimaculatus
 Simoselaps fasciolatus
 Simoselaps semifasciatus
 Suta monachus
 Suta nigriceps
 Suta spectabilis
 Suta suta
 Bandy-bandy, Vermicella annulata

South East 
 Austrelaps superbus
 Drysdalia coronoides
 Drysdalia mastersii
 Echiopsis curta
 Notechis ater
 Notechis scutatus
 Pseudonaja textilis
 Simoselaps australis
 Suta flagellum
 Suta nigriceps

Southern & Hills 
 Acanthophis antarcticus
 Austrelaps superbus
 Demansia psammophis
 Notechis ater
 Notechis scutatus
 Pseudechis porphyriacus
 Pseudonaja nuchalis
 Pseudonaja textilis
 Suta flagellum
 Suta spectabilis
 Suta suta

Queensland

Brisbane 
 Acanthophis antarcticus
 Boiga irregularis
 Cacophis harriettae
 Cacophis krefftii
 Cacophis squamulosus
 Demansia psammophis
 Dendrelaphis punctulata
 Furina diadema
 Hemiaspis signata
 Hoplocephalus bitorquatus
 Hoplocephalus stephensii
 Liasis maculosus
 Morelia spilota variegata
 Notechis scutatus
 Oxyuranus scutellatus
 Pseudechis australis
 Pseudechis guttatus
 Pseudechis porphyriacus
 Pseudonaja textilis
 Cryptophis nigrescens
 Simoselaps australis
 Tropidechis carinatus
 Tropidonophis mairii
 Bandy-bandy, Vermicella annulata

Central West 
 Acanthophis antarcticus
 Acanthophis praelongus
 Aspidites ramsayi
 Aspidites melanocephalus
 Demansia olivacea
 Demansia psammophis
 Demansia torquata
 Denisonia devisi
 Denisonia maculata
 Furina barnardi
 Furina diadema
 Furina dunmalli
 Furina ornata
 Hemiaspis damelii
 Hoplocephalus bitorquatus
 Liasis olivaceus
 Liasis stimsoni
 Morelia spilota variegata
 Oxyuranus microlepidotus
 Pseudechis australis
 Pseudechis colletti
 Pseudonaja guttata
 Pseudonaja ingrami
 Pseudonaja modesta
 Pseudonaja nuchalis
 Pseudonaja textilis
 Cryptophis boschmai
 Simoselaps australis
 Simoselaps fasciolatus
 Simoselaps incinctus
 Simoselaps semifasciatus
 Suta punctata
 Suta suta
 Bandy-bandy, Vermicella annulata

Far North 
 Acanthophis antarcticus
 Acanthophis praelongus
 Antaioserpens warro
 Aspidites melanocephalus
 Boiga irregularis
 Cacophis harriettae
 Cacophis squamulosus
 Cerberus rynchops
 Chondropython viridis
 Cryptophis boschmai
 Cryptophis nigrescens
 Cryptophis nigrostriatus
 Demansia papuensis
 Demansia psammophis
 Demansia torquata
 Demansia atra
 Dendrelaphis calligastra
 Dendrelaphis punctulata
 Fordonia leucobalia
 Furina barnardi
 Furina ornata
 Furina tristis
 Hemiaspis signata
 Hoplocephalus bitorquatus
 Liasis albertisii
 Liasis childreni
 Liasis fuscus
 Liasis maculosus
 Liasis olivaceus
 Liasis stimsoni
 Morelia amethistina
 Morelia spilota variegata
 Oxyuranus scutellatus
 Pseudechis australis
 Pseudechis porphyriacus
 Pseudoferania polylepis
 Pseudonaja nuchalis
 Pseudonaja textilis
 Simoselaps semifasciatus
 Stegonotus cucullatus
 Suta suta
 Tropidechis carinatus
 Tropidonophis mairii
 Bandy-bandy, Vermicella annulata

Gold Coast 
 Acanthophis antarcticus
 Aspidites ramsayi
 Boiga irregularis
 Cacophis harriettae
 Cacophis squamulosus
 Demansia psammophis
 Demansia vestigiata
 Dendrelaphis punctulata
 Furina diadema
 Furina dunmalli
 Hemiaspis signata
 Hoplocephalus bitorquatus
 Liasis maculosus
 Morelia spilota variegata
 Notechis scutatus
 Oxyuranus scutellatus
 Pseudechis australis
 Pseudechis guttatus
 Pseudechis porphyriacus
 Pseudonaja nuchalis
 Pseudonaja textilis
 Cryptophis boschmai
 Cryptophis nigrescens
 Cryptophis nigrostriatus
 Tropidonophis mairii
 Bandy-bandy, Vermicella annulata

North West 
 Acanthophis antarcticus
 Acanthophis praelongus
 Aspidites melanocephalus
 Boiga irregularis
 Cerberus rynchops
 Demansia olivacea
 Demansia papuensis
 Demansia psammophis
 Demansia torquata
 Demansia vestigiata
 Dendrelaphis punctulata
 Denisonia devisi
 Pseudoferania polylepis
 Fordonia leucobalia
 Furina ornata
 Liasis childreni
 Liasis fuscus
 Liasis olivaceus
 Liasis stimsoni
 Morelia spilota variegata
 Oxyuranus scutellatus
 Pseudechis australis
 Pseudechis colletti
 Pseudonaja guttata
 Pseudonaja ingrami
 Pseudonaja modesta
 Pseudonaja nuchalis
 Pseudonaja textilis
 Cryptophis boschmai
 Simoselaps incinctus
 Simoselaps semifasciatus
 Stegonotus cucullatus
 Suta punctata
 Suta suta
 Tropidonophis mairii
 Bandy-bandy, Vermicella annulata

Rockhampton 
 Acanthophis antarcticus
 Aspidites melanocephalus
 Boiga irregularis
 Cacophis harriettae
 Cacophis squamulosus
 Demansia psammophis
 Demansia torquata
 Demansia vestigiata
 Dendrelaphis punctulata
 Denisonia maculata
 Furina diadema
 Furina ornata
 Hemiaspis damelii
 Hemiaspis signata
 Hoplocephalus bitorquatus
 Liasis maculosus
 Morelia spilota variegata
 Oxyuranus scutellatus
 Pseudechis australis
 Pseudechis guttatus
 Pseudechis porphyriacus
 Pseudonaja textilis
 Cryptophis boschmai
 Cryptophis nigrescens
 Cryptophis nigrostriatus
 Simoselaps australis
 Suta suta
 Tropidonophis mairii
 Bandy-bandy, Vermicella annulata

Mackay 
 Aspidites melanocephalus
 Boiga irregularis
 Cacophis harriettae
 Cacophis squamulosus
 Demansia psammophis
 Demansia torquata
 Demansia vestigiata
 Dendrelaphis punctulata
 Denisonia devisi
 Furina barnardi
 Furina diadema
 Furina ornata
 Hemiaspis signata
 Hoplocephalus bitorquatus
 Liasis maculosus
 Morelia spilota variegata
 Oxyuranus scutellatus
 Pseudechis australis
 Pseudechis porphyriacus
 Pseudonaja guttata
 Pseudonaja textilis
 Cryptophis boschmai
 Cryptophis nigrescens
 Cryptophis nigrostriatus
 Simoselaps australis
 Simoselaps semifasciatus
 Antaioserpens warro
 Suta suta
 Tropidonophis mairii
 Bandy-bandy, Vermicella annulata

South East 
 Acanthophis antarcticus
 Aspidites ramsayi
 Boiga irregularis
 Cacophis harriettae
 Cacophis squamulosus
 Demansia psammophis
 Demansia vestigiata
 Dendrelaphis punctulata
 Furina diadema
 Furina dunmalli
 Hemiaspis signata
 Hoplocephalus bitorquatus
 Liasis maculosus
 Morelia spilota variegata
 Notechis scutatus
 Oxyuranus scutellatus
 Pseudechis australis
 Pseudechis guttatus
 Pseudechis porphyriacus
 Pseudonaja nuchalis
 Pseudonaja textilis
 Cryptophis boschmai
 Cryptophis nigrescens
 Cryptophis nigrostriatus
 Tropidonophis mairii
 Bandy-bandy, Vermicella annulata

South West 
 Acanthophis antarcticus
 Acanthophis pyrrhus
 Aspidites ramsayi
 Aspidites melanocephalus
 Demansia psammophis
 Demansia torquata
 Denisonia devisi
 Furina diadema
 Furina dunmalli
 Furina ornata
 Hemiaspis damelii
 Hoplocephalus bitorquatus
 Liasis maculosus
 Liasis stimsoni
 Morelia spilota variegata
 Notechis scutatus
 Oxyuranus microlepidotus
 Pseudechis australis
 Pseudechis colletti
 Pseudechis guttatus
 Pseudechis porphyriacus
 Pseudonaja guttata
 Pseudonaja ingrami
 Pseudonaja modesta
 Pseudonaja nuchalis
 Pseudonaja textilis
 Cryptophis boschmai
 Cryptophis nigrescens
 Simoselaps australis
 Simoselaps fasciolatus
 Suta spectabilis
 Suta suta
 Bandy-bandy, Vermicella annulata

Sunshine Coast 
 Acanthophis antarcticus
 Boiga irregularis
 Cacophis harriettae
 Cacophis squamulosus
 Demansia psammophis
 Demansia vestigiata
 Dendrelaphis punctulata
 Furina diadema
 Hemiaspis signata
 Hoplocephalus bitorquatus
 Liasis maculosus
 Morelia spilota mcdowelli
 Notechis scutatus
 Oxyuranus scutellatus
 Pseudechis porphyriacus
 Pseudonaja textilis
 Cryptophis boschmai
 Cryptophis nigrescens
 Cryptophis nigrostriatus
 Tropidonophis mairii
 Bandy-bandy, Vermicella annulata

Townsville 
 Acanthophis antarcticus
 Acanthophis praelongus
 Aspidites melanocephalus
 Boiga irregularis
 Cacophis harriettae
 Cacophis krefftii
 Cacophis squamulosus
 Demansia psammophis
 Demansia torquata
 Demansia vestigiata
 Dendrelaphis punctulata
 Pseudoferania polylepis
 Furina barnardi
 Furina diadema
 Furina ornata
 Hemiaspis signata
 Hoplocephalus bitorquatus
 Liasis fuscus
 Liasis maculosus
 Morelia spilota variegata
 Oxyuranus scutellatus
 Pseudechis australis
 Pseudechis porphyriacus
 Pseudonaja textilis
 Cryptophis boschmai
 Cryptophis nigrescens
 Cryptophis nigrostriatus
 Simoselaps australis
 Simoselaps semifasciatus
 Suta suta
 Tropidonophis mairii
 Bandy-bandy, Vermicella annulata

Wide Bay 
 Acanthophis antarcticus
 Aspidites ramsayi
 Boiga irregularis
 Cacophis harriettae
 Cacophis squamulosus
 Demansia psammophis
 Demansia vestigiata
 Dendrelaphis punctulata
 Furina diadema
 Furina dunmalli
 Hemiaspis signata
 Hoplocephalus bitorquatus
 Liasis maculosus
 Morelia spilota variegata
 Notechis scutatus
 Oxyuranus scutellatus
 Pseudechis australis
 Pseudechis guttatus
 Pseudechis porphyriacus
 Pseudonaja nuchalis
 Pseudonaja textilis
 Cryptophis boschmai
 Cryptophis nigrescens
 Cryptophis nigrostriatus
 Tropidonophis mairii
 Bandy-bandy, Vermicella annulata

NSW & ACT

Central Coast 
 Acanthophis antarcticus
 Austrelaps ramsayi
 Boiga irregularis
 Cacophis krefftii
 Cacophis squamulosus
 Demansia psammophis
 Dendrelaphis punctulata
 Drysdalia coronoides
 Drysdalia rhodogaster
 Furina diadema
 Hemiaspis signata
 Hoplocephalus bitorquatus
 Hoplocephalus bungaroides
 Hoplocephalus stephensii
 Morelia spilota spilota
 Notechis scutatus
 Pseudechis porphyriacus
 Pseudonaja textilis
 Cryptophis nigrescens
 Suta spectabilis
 Bandy-bandy, Vermicella annulata

Central West 
 Austrelaps ramsayi
 Demansia psammophis
 Dendrelaphis punctulata
 Drysdalia coronoides
 Furina diadema
 Hoplocephalus bungaroides
 Morelia spilota variegata
 Notechis scutatus
 Pseudechis australis
 Pseudechis guttatus
 Pseudechis porphyriacus
 Pseudonaja nuchalis
 Pseudonaja textilis
 Cryptophis nigrescens
 Simoselaps australis
 Suta flagellum
 Suta gouldii
 Suta nigriceps
 Suta suta
 Bandy-bandy, Vermicella annulata

Far West 
 Aspidites ramsayi
 Demansia psammophis
 Demansia torquata
 Furina diadema
 Liasis stimsoni
 Morelia spilota variegata
 Pseudechis australis
 Pseudechis porphyriacus
 Pseudonaja modesta
 Pseudonaja textilis
 Simoselaps australis
 Simoselaps fasciolatus
 Suta spectabilis
 Suta suta
 Bandy-bandy, Vermicella annulata

Hunter 
 Acanthophis antarcticus
 Austrelaps ramsayi
 Boiga irregularis
 Cacophis krefftii
 Cacophis squamulosus
 Demansia psammophis
 Dendrelaphis punctulata
 Drysdalia coronoides
 Furina diadema
 Hemiaspis signata
 Hoplocephalus bitorquatus
 Hoplocephalus stephensii
 Morelia spilota spilota
 Notechis scutatus
 Pseudechis guttatus
 Pseudechis porphyriacus
 Pseudonaja textilis
 Cryptophis nigrescens
 Suta spectabilis
 Suta suta
 Tropidechis carinatus
 Bandy-bandy, Vermicella annulata

Illawarra 
 Acanthophis antarcticus
 Austrelaps ramsayi
 Cacophis squamulosus
 Demansia psammophis
 Drysdalia coronoides
 Drysdalia rhodogaster
 Furina diadema
 Hemiaspis signata
 Hoplocephalus bungaroides
 Morelia spilota spilota
 Notechis scutatus
 Pseudechis porphyriacus
 Pseudonaja textilis
 Cryptophis nigrescens
 Suta spectabilis
 Bandy-bandy, Vermicella annulata

Mid North Coast 
 Acanthophis antarcticus
 Austrelaps ramsayi
 Boiga irregularis
 Cacophis krefftii
 Cacophis squamulosus
 Demansia psammophis
 Dendrelaphis punctulata
 Drysdalia coronoides
 Furina diadema
 Hemiaspis signata
 Hoplocephalus bitorquatus
 Hoplocephalus stephensii
 Morelia spilota variegata
 Notechis scutatus
 Pseudechis guttatus
 Pseudechis porphyriacus
 Pseudonaja textilis
 Cryptophis nigrescens
 Suta suta
 Tropidechis carinatus
 Bandy-bandy, Vermicella annulata

Murray 
 Austrelaps ramsayi
 Demansia psammophis
 Drysdalia coronoides
 Echiopsis curta
 Hemiaspis damelii
 Morelia spilota variegata
 Notechis scutatus
 Oxyuranus microlepidotus
 Pseudechis australis
 Pseudechis porphyriacus
 Pseudonaja nuchalis
 Pseudonaja textilis
 Cryptophis nigrescens
 Simoselaps australis
 Suta nigriceps
 Suta spectabilis
 Suta suta
 Bandy-bandy, Vermicella annulata

Murrumbidgee 
 Acanthophis antarcticus
 Demansia psammophis
 Morelia spilota variegata
 Notechis scutatus
 Pseudechis australis
 Pseudechis porphyriacus
 Pseudonaja nuchalis
 Pseudonaja textilis
 Simoselaps australis
 Suta spectabilis
 Suta suta
 Bandy-bandy, Vermicella annulata

North Western 
 Acanthophis antarcticus
 Aspidites ramsayi
 Demansia psammophis
 Dendrelaphis punctulata
 Denisonia devisi
 Furina diadema
 Hemiaspis damelii
 Hoplocephalus bitorquatus
 Morelia spilota variegata
 Oxyuranus microlepidotus
 Pseudechis australis
 Pseudechis guttatus
 Pseudechis porphyriacus
 Pseudonaja modesta
 Pseudonaja nuchalis
 Pseudonaja textilis
 Simoselaps australis
 Simoselaps fasciolatus
 Suta nigriceps
 Suta spectabilis
 Suta suta
 Bandy-bandy, Vermicella annulata

Northern Rivers 

 Acanthophis antarcticus
 Boiga irregularis
 Cacophis harriettae
 Cacophis krefftii
 Cacophis squamulosus
 Demansia psammophis
 Dendrelaphis punctulata
 Furina diadema
 Hemiaspis signata
 Hoplocephalus bitorquatus
 Hoplocephalus stephensii
 Liasis maculosus
 Morelia spilota variegata
 Notechis scutatus
 Pseudechis porphyriacus
 Pseudonaja textilis
 Cryptophis nigrescens
 Simoselaps australis
 Tropidechis carinatus
 Tropidonophis mairii
 Bandy-bandy, Vermicella annulata

Northern Tablelands 
 Liasis maculosus
 Morelia spilota variegata
 Boiga irregularis
 Dendrelaphis punctulata
 Acanthophis antarcticus
 Austrelaps ramsayi
 Cacophis krefftii
 Cacophis squamulosus
 Demansia psammophis
 Denisonia devisi
 Drysdalia coronoides
 Furina diadema
 Furina dunmalli
 Hemiaspis damelii
 Hemiaspis signata
 Hoplocephalus bitorquatus
 Notechis scutatus
 Pseudechis australis
 Pseudechis porphyriacus
 Pseudechis guttatus
 Pseudonaja nuchalis
 Pseudonaja textilis
 Cryptophis nigrescens
 Simoselaps australis
 Suta suta
 Bandy-bandy, Vermicella annulata
 Tropidechis carinatus

South Coast 
 Acanthophis antarcticus
 Austrelaps ramsayi
 Drysdalia coronoides
 Drysdalia rhodogaster
 Morelia spilota spilota
 Notechis scutatus
 Pseudechis porphyriacus
 Pseudonaja textilis
 Cryptophis nigrescens
 Suta flagellum

South East 
 Acanthophis antarcticus
 Austrelaps ramsayi
 Cacophis squamulosus
 Demansia psammophis
 Drysdalia coronoides
 Drysdalia rhodogaster
 Furina diadema
 Morelia spilota variegata
 Notechis scutatus
 Pseudechis porphyriacus
 Pseudonaja textilis
 Cryptophis nigrescens
 Suta flagellum
 Suta spectabilis
 Suta suta
 Bandy-bandy, Vermicella annulata

Sydney 
 Acanthophis antarcticus
 Austrelaps ramsayi
 Austrelaps superbus
 Boiga irregularis
 Cacophis krefftii
 Cacophis squamulosus
 Demansia psammophis
 Dendrelaphis punctulatus
 Drysdalia coronoides
 Drysdalia rhodogaster
 Furina diadema
 Hemiaspis signata
 Hoplocephalus bitorquatus
 Hoplocephalus bungaroides
 Hoplocephalus stephensii
 Morelia spilota spilota
 Morelia spilota variegata
 Notechis scutatus
 Pseudechis porphyriacus
 Pseudonaja textilis

External links
Australian Wildlife

 
Snakes by location